The Mastery of John Coltrane, Vol. IV: Trane's Modes is a compilation album by American saxophonist John Coltrane, released as a double LP in 1979. It features pieces recorded in 1961, two in studio and the remainder live. All the tracks were previously unissued, at the time of release. At present, "Africa (First Version)" and "The Damned Don't Cry" may be found on the two-disc reissue of Africa/Brass, while all the live pieces have been included on The Complete 1961 Village Vanguard Recordings.

Reception

In a review for AllMusic, Scott Yanow wrote: "this two-LP set will be well worth searching for. These six performances from the Vanguard do not duplicate any other recordings. There are two more runthroughs on 'Impressions,' a 15-minute 'Chasin' Another Trane,' 'Greensleeves,' 'Miles' Mode' and a strange version of 'Naima' in which Coltrane purposely plays the melody sideways... This two-fer is rounded out by two previously unissued performances... from the Africa/Brass sessions in which Coltrane is backed by a medium-size orchestra for some stirring music."

Track listing
"Impressions" (Take 1) – 8:50
"Miles' Mode" – 10:00
"Chasin' Another Trane" – 15:34
"Greensleeves" (Take 2) – 4:50
"Impressions" (Take 2) – 10:55
"Naima" – 7:39
"Africa" (First Version) – 14:06
"The Damned Don't Cry" – 7:38

Personnel
John Coltrane – tenor and soprano saxophone
Eric Dolphy – alto saxophone, Reeds
Booker Little (7–8), Freddie Hubbard (7–8) – trumpet
Donald Corrado (7–8), Jimmy Buffington (7–8), Julius Watkins (7–8) – French horn
Charles Greenlee (7–8), Julian Priester (7–8) – euphonium
Garvin Bushell (7–8), Pat Patrick (7–8) – Reeds
McCoy Tyner – piano
Jimmy Garrison (1–2, 5), Reggie Workman (3–4, 6–8), Paul Chambers (7–8) – bass
Elvin Jones – drums

References

Impulse! Records compilation albums
John Coltrane compilation albums
1979 compilation albums
Albums produced by Bob Thiele
Compilation albums published posthumously